Heavy Starry Heavenly is the second album by the Brilliant Green vocalist Tomoko Kawase under her pseudonym Tommy heavenly6.

Overview
"Heavy Starry Heavenly" is Tommy Heavenly6's second studio album, released two years after Tommy Heavenly6. (As stated on the cover) it is billed as "the "dramatic" new album" featuring "12 cute new songs". Following the release of "Tommy heavenly6", Kawase released a continuous string of singles starting with I'm Gonna Scream+ and finally ending a single-productive phase with Heavy Starry Chain. Each single in between "Tommy heavenly6" and "Heavy Starry Heavenly" was included on the album (as well as their B-side tracks).

The initial Limited Edition pressing includes a bonus promotional DVD, including music videos and "making of" videos.

Track listing

Heavy Starry Tour '07
After the release of the album, Kawase started on her "Tommy heavenly6 Heavy Starry Tour '07" in order to promote the album. The tour consisted of four live shows in four cities around Japan, taking place in March 2007. The shows took place in Fukuoka, Aichi, Osaka and finally ending in Tokyo. On certain legs of the tour, her bandmates from The Brilliant Green appeared as guest musicians. The songs played were from both "Heavy Starry Heavenly" and "Tommy heavenly6".

Tour setlist
Wait Till I Can Dream
Stay Away from Me
I'm Gonna Scream+
Door Mat
2Bfree
My Bloody-Knee-High-Socks
+Gothic Pink+
Lollipop Candy Bad Girl (Album Version)
Gimme All of Your Love!!
LCDD
Roller Coaster Ride
Pray
Heavy Starry Chain
Ready? (encore)
Hey My Friend (encore)
Lucky Me (encore)

References

External links 
 Tommy heavenly6 Official Site

Tomoko Kawase albums
Defstar Records albums
2007 albums